Sue Goffe is an English film maker.

On 24 January 2012 she was nominated for an Academy Award for the animated short film A Morning Stroll. She shared her nomination with Grant Orchard at the 84th Academy Awards.

Filmography
A Morning Stroll (short) (producer) 2011
Varmints (short) (executive producer, producer)2009
Lost and Found (TV short) (producer)2008
Jojo in the Stars (short) (executive producer, producer) 2003
Operavox (TV series) (producer - 1 episode) 1995
Hey Duggee (TV series) (executive producer) 2014

References

External links

Living people
British women film directors
Year of birth missing (living people)